The London county hurling team represents London in hurling and is governed by London GAA, the county board of the Gaelic Athletic Association. The team competes in the Christy Ring Cup and the National Hurling League. It formerly competed in the Ulster and Leinster Senior Hurling Championships.

London's home ground is McGovern Park, South Ruislip, Oxley Park, Watford. The team's manager is Fergus McMahon.

The team last won the All-Ireland Senior Championship in 1901 but has never won the National League.

History
London has a strong hurling tradition. It claims consistently good results in the National Hurling League. As a mid-table Division 2 side, London is actually placed above half the counties of Ireland, in strong contrast to the county's role as whipping boys in the other Gaelic sport of football (see London's record in football).

The county won the 1901 All-Ireland Senior Hurling Championship (SHC).

In the 1973 All-Ireland SHC, a London team that included six Galwaymen defeated Galway by a scoreline of 4–7 to 3–5 in the All-Ireland SHC quarter-final at Ballinasloe. Galwaymen Frank Canning and Lennie Burke scored three of the goals against their old county.

London won five All-Ireland B Championships between 1985 and 1995.

London won the inaugural Nicky Rackard Cup in 2005, defeating Louth's hurlers by 15 points in the final.

London defeated Derry in the 2010 Ulster Senior Hurling Championship quarter-final at Casement Park to qualify for a semi-final against Down.

London won the 2011 Nicky Rackard Cup, defeating Louth in the final.

London won the 2012 Christy Ring Cup, defeating Wicklow by a scoreline of 4–18 to 1–17. This gained the county promotion to the 2013 All-Ireland SHC, facing Carlow in its opening match. It then lost to Westmeath in an All-Ireland SHC qualifier.

In the 2014 All-Ireland SHC, London finished bottom of the preliminary group after being beaten by Westmeath in the final game of the round robin stage in Mullingar, and the county was relegated back to the Christy Ring Cup for the 2015 season.

London finished runner-up in the 2018 Christy Ring Cup.

Although the footballers withdrew due to the UK's 2001 foot-and-mouth outbreak, the hurlers stayed in the championship that year, but all withdrew from the 2020 and 2021 championships due to the impact of the COVID-19 pandemic on Gaelic games.

Kit evolution
London released a new jersey ahead of the 2017 season.

London released home and away jerseys to commemorate its 125th anniversary in 2021. Inspired by the jersey worn in the 1901 All-Ireland Senior Hurling Championship Final (its only All-Ireland senior win), both jerseys featured a sash from the left hip to the right shoulder.

Current management team
Manager: Fergus McMahon

Managerial history
Eamonn Phelan: played until 2010, manager for 2011 final, 2012 final (see sources concerning those games)
Fergus McMahon:  2017

Honours
All-Ireland Senior Hurling Championship
 Winners (1): 1901
 Runners-up (3): 1900, 1902, 1903
All-Ireland Senior B Hurling Championship
 Winners (5): 1985, 1987, 1988, 1990, 1995
 Runners-up (15): 
All-Ireland Junior Hurling Championship
 Winners (5): 1938, 1949, 1959, 1960, 1963
 
Christy Ring Cup
 Winners (1):  2012
 Runners-up (1): 2018
Nicky Rackard Cup
 Winners (2): 2005, 2011
 Runners-up (2): 2009, 2010
Kehoe Cup
 Winners (2):  1987, 1988
 Runners-up (2): 1983, 2003

References

 
County hurling teams